Nilvadipine is a calcium channel blocker (CCB) used for the treatment of hypertension and chronic major cerebral artery occlusion. 

Pathohistochemical studies have revealed that the volume of the infarction in the middle cerebral artery occlusion model could be decreased by nilvadipine.

Experimental research

Nilvadipine was tested in clinical trial as a possible treatment for Alzheimer's disease in Ireland by the Roskamp Institute, Florida, USA and Trinity College, Ireland. Following this study, an international research consortium led by Trinity College Dublin (Ireland) in May 2011 announced the selection for funding of a large-scale European clinical trial of nilvadipine. More than 500 Alzheimer's disease patients will participate in the multicenter phase III clinical trial designed to study the effectiveness of nilvadipine.

References

Calcium channel blockers
Dihydropyridines
Conjugated nitriles
Nitrobenzenes
Carboxylate esters
Isopropyl esters